The 2015 New South Wales Swifts season saw New South Wales Swifts compete in the 2015 ANZ Championship. Swifts finished the regular season in second place in the Australian Conference. In the play-offs, they defeated West Coast Fever and Waikato Bay of Plenty Magic but twice lost narrowly to Queensland Firebirds in both the Australian Conference final and the Grand Final. It was Swifts' first appearance in the title decider since their successful 2008 campaign.

Players

Player movements

2015 roster

Debutants
 Jade Clarke and Julie Corletto both make their Swifts debut in Round 1 against Southern Steel.  	
 Stephanie Wood made her ANZ Championship debut for Swifts in Round 2 against Waikato Bay of Plenty Magic. 
 Erin Hoare made her Swifts debut in Round 7 against Adelaide Thunderbirds.

Gold medallists
Julie Corletto, Kimberlee Green, Paige Hadley, Sharni Layton and  Caitlin Thwaites were all members of the Australia team that won the gold medal at the 2015 Netball World Cup. The squad also included former Swifts' players, Erin Bell and Rebecca Bulley.

Summer Shootout
Between 6 and 8 February, New South Wales Swifts hosted the Summer Shootout at Netball Central, Sydney Olympic Park. This was the first major netball tournament to be held at the venue. All ten ANZ Championship teams participated in the three-day tournament. A total of 25 games, consisting of both full length and shortened games consisting of two 15-minute periods, were played over the weekend.

Regular season

Fixtures and results
Round 1

Round 2

Round 3

Round 4

Round 5

Round 6
 received a bye.
Round 7

Round 8

Round 9

Round 10

Round 11

Round 12

Round 13

Round 14

Standings

Play-offs

Elimination Final
Australian Conference

Conference Finals
Australian Conference

Semi-final

Grand Final

Award winners

NSW Swifts awards

ANZ Championship awards

All Star Team

Australian Netball Awards

References

New South Wales Swifts seasons
New South Wales Swifts